Emīlija or Emilija is a given name. Notable people with the name include:

Emīlija Benjamiņa (1881–1941), Latvian businesswoman in publishing
Emilija Erčić (born 1962), former Yugoslav handball player
Emilija Kokić (born 1968), Croatian singer
Emilija Manninen (born 1981), Estonian hurdler

es:Emilija
fr:Emilija